Joe Robert Pemagbi (born 22 November 1945 in Bo, British Sierra Leone) is a Sierra Leonean diplomat. He has been the Sierra Leonean Ambassador to the United Nations since March 2003. He is also a graduate of Njala University college where he also was a long time staff member: Language department head from 1986 to 1995, Dean from 1988 to 1992, and associate professor from 1991 to 1995). He was also chairperson of the National Commission for Democracy and Human Rights from 1999 to March 2003. He is a member of the Mende ethnic group. During his time as the chairman of the NCDHR, he effortlessly continued lecturing at his Alma Mata. He is still one of Sierra Leone's most renowned linguists. He hols an MPhil in Linguistics from Leeds University.

References

1945 births
Living people
Njala University alumni
People from Bo, Sierra Leone
Sierra Leonean diplomats
Permanent Representatives of Sierra Leone to the United Nations
Mende people
Academic staff of Njala University